Best: 2000–2020 (stylized as BEST ~2000–2020~) is a compilation album by Japanese singer-songwriter Koda Kumi, containing her most popular songs since her debut. The album was released on her twenty-first anniversary on December 6, 2021. 

The album included all of her A-sides since she debuted with Take Back in December 2000 until her EP Angel + Monster in December 2020. 

The album was released as a 3CD+DVD and a fan club exclusive 8CD+3Blu-ray. The covers for the album referenced both her prior greatest hits albums Best: Second Session (2006) and Best: Third Universe (2010). Both editions featured new arrangements for several previously released songs, including "Cutie Honey" and "Walk of My Life."

Information
Best ~2000–2020~ is the eighth compilation album and fourth greatest hits album by Japanese artist Koda Kumi, released on her 21st anniversary, December 6, 2021. The album peaked at number 19 on its first week on the Oricon Albums Chart and remained on the charts for seven weeks, selling 7,080 units. 

The album was released in two editions, a 3CD+DVD that was released publicly and a limited 8CD+3Blu-ray fan club exclusive. Both editions contained new arrangements of the songs "Cutie Honey", "Hands", "D.D.D", "LIT" and "Walk of My Life". The fan club edition housed every promotional single since her debut, while the standard edition contained her most popular singles from each album. The DVD held each of her most popular music videos, while the three Blu-rays carried every music video since 2000. The Blu-ray also featured the three music videos from Fever: Legend Live, which Koda Kumi had released during the promotional campaign for SANKYO's pachinko game, Fever Legend in 2014.

The album was preceded by the extended play Angel + Monster. However, the music videos for "Killer Monster" and "Run" were both omitted from the standard DVD and the limited Blu-ray.

There were several songs omitted from both the 8CD and 3CD editions, despite being released as A-sides throughout her career. These songs included "Won't Be Long" with Exile (2006), "Last Angel" featuring South Korean group TVXQ (2007), "Run for Your Life" (2007), "That Ain't Cool" featuring American artist Fergie (2008), "Faraway" (2009), "Walk ~To the Future~" (2010) and "Money in My Bag" (2014). 

None of the songs from her cover albums Eternity: Love & Songs (2010) and Color the Cover (2013) were included in the set.

Promotional activities
To help promote the album, Kumi released a "Best ~2000–2020~" version of her 2004 song "Cutie Honey" on October 25, 2021. On the same day, she also released the song "4 More" (stylized as 4 MORE) and "100 no Kodoku Tachi e" (100のコドク達へ / To 100 Lonely Souls). The latter two songs were released on her 2022 studio album Heart.

Track listing

8CD+3Blu-ray

3CD+DVD

Charts (Japan)

References

Koda Kumi albums
2021 greatest hits albums
2021 video albums
Music video compilation albums
Avex Group compilation albums
Avex Group video albums